The DR Congo U-20 women's national football team represents Democratic Republic of the Congo in international women's football for under 20. The team plays its home games in Kinshasa. DR Congo became African champions twice, in 2006 and 2008, and took part in the World Cup in the same two years.

See also
DR Congo women's national football team

References

 
National
African women's national under-20 association football teams